is a member of the House of Representatives in the National Diet of Japan, representing the 22nd District of Tokyo.

Born in Tokyo, Ito graduated from Faculty of Law, Keio-Gijuku University and joined Matsushita Institute of Government and Management in 1984. He was first elected to the House of Representatives in 1993.  In 2004, he was appointed the Minister of State for Financial Services in the Cabinet of Prime Minister Junichiro Koizumi.

External links 
 http://www.kantei.go.jp/foreign/koizumidaijin/040927/15ito_e.html
http://www.brisbanetimes.com.au/world/power-firm-missed-tsunami-risk-20110320-1c293.html

1961 births
Living people
People from Osaka
People from Tokyo
Academic staff of Kansai University
Keio University alumni
Members of the House of Representatives from Tokyo
Government ministers of Japan
21st-century Japanese politicians